Officers' Christian Fellowship (OCF) is a nonprofit Christian parachurch organization of 17,000 U.S. Military officers, family members, and friends found at installations throughout the military. Founded in 1943, the organization's purpose remains to glorify God by uniting Christian officers for biblical fellowship and outreach, equipping and encouraging them to minister effectively in the military society. OCF operates Spring Canyon (CO) and White Sulphur Springs (PA), Christian camps and conference centers serving active duty military, veterans, enlisted soldiers, and families along with Christian church organizations. Although the Military Religious Freedom Foundation accused OCF of improper proselytization in 2008, journalist Jeff Sharlet reported that the Obama administration saw no significant problems with this organization or its activities.

Origins
Officers' Christian Fellowship started as a small Bible study group in Washington, D.C., in the World War II-era. Founded as the Officers' Christian Union in 1943, the name was changed to Officers' Christian Fellowship in 1972. One of the Bible study group's original members, General Hayes Kroner, became OCF's first president.  By 1947, after a year at West Point and Annapolis, membership of the organization grew to 41 army cadets and naval mid-shipmen. It was these members and other working officers, rather than a professional staff, who were responsible for the organization's growth in its early years.

History
Its president from 1954 until 1972 was lieutenant general William Kelly Harrison Jr.

White Sulphur Springs, PA Eastern OCF Retreat Center main lodge bears name of Lt  General William K Harrison, USA
Spring Canyon, Colorado Springs, CO Western OCF Retreat Center

See also
Christians in the military
Armed Forces Christian Union

Further reading
 More Than Conquerors: A History of the Officers' Christian Fellowship of the U.S.A., 1943 to 1983. Robert W. Spoede. OCF Books, 1993. .

Notes

External links
 Official site
 Naval OCF site
 Air Force OCF site
 Spring Canyon site
 White Sulphur Springs site

1943 establishments in the United States
Evangelical parachurch organizations
Christian organizations established in 1943
1943 establishments in Washington, D.C.
Religion in the United States military